Metaxymorpha is a genus of beetles in the family Buprestidae, containing the following species:

 Metaxymorpha alexanderiensis Nylander, 2008
 Metaxymorpha apicalis (van de Poll, 1886)
 Metaxymorpha apicerubra Thery, 1923
 Metaxymorpha dohertyi Thery, 1923
 Metaxymorpha gloriosa Blackburn, 1894
 Metaxymorpha grayii (Parry, 1848)
 Metaxymorpha hanloni Nylander, 2008
 Metaxymorpha hauseri Thery, 1926
 Metaxymorpha hilleri Nylander, 2004
 Metaxymorpha hudsoni Nylander, 2001
 Metaxymorpha imitator Neef de Sainval, 1994
 Metaxymorpha landeri Nylander, 2001
 Metaxymorpha mariettae Nylander, 2004
 Metaxymorpha meeki Thery, 1923
 Metaxymorpha nigrofasciata Nylander, 2001
 Metaxymorpha nigrosuturalis Neef de Sainval & Lander, 1993
 Metaxymorpha pledgeri Nylander, 2001
 Metaxymorpha sternalis Hoscheck, 1931

References

Buprestidae genera